Callindra arginalis is a moth in the family Erebidae first described by George Hampson in 1894. It is found in eastern India and Guangxi and Yunnan in China.

References

Dubatolov, V. V. & Kishida, Y. (2006). "On the re-arrangement of the East Asian Callimorpha species (Lepidoptera, Arctiidae". Tinea. 19 (2): 111–125.

Callimorphina
Moths described in 1894